"Haunting Me" is a song by American industrial rock band Stabbing Westward. The song was released as the third and final single from the 1998 album Darkest Days. The song was featured in the 1998 film The Faculty.

Track listing

Charts

Personnel
 Christopher Hall – vocals
 Marcus Eliopulos – guitar
 Jim Sellers – bass
 Walter Flakus – keyboards
 Andy Kubiszewski – drums

References

1999 singles
Stabbing Westward songs
Columbia Records singles
1998 songs
Songs written by Andy Kubiszewski
Songs written by Christopher Hall (musician)